Netta Rheinberg MBE (24 October 1911 – 18 June 2006) was an English cricketer, journalist and administrator. She appeared in one Test match for England in 1949, against Australia. She played domestic cricket for Middlesex.

Her single Test match came on England's tour of Australia in 1948/49. She was the team's manager, and had to play in the match because of injuries to other players. She made a "pair", becoming the first woman to do so on Test debut.

Rheinberg was most notable in the women's game as an administrator and journalist. Rachael Heyhoe-Flint, the former England captain, said of her work as an administrator, "Netta was an action girl. We had very few people then, and she galvanised activity, partly just by having a great personality and a sense of humour."

"For a north London Jew, playing cricket for England and being one of the game’s most important administrators is about as well-trodden a career path as prime minister or bacon-buttie salesman," wrote Rob Steen shortly after her death aged 94 in 2006. "That Rheinberg happened to be a woman made her accomplishments all the more admirable."

She was secretary of the Women's Cricket Association in 1945 and from 1948 to 1958. She was also membership secretary and vice-chairman of the Cricket Society. She edited the magazine Women's Cricket, reported on women's cricket for Wisden for more than thirty years, and wrote a regular column for The Cricketer. 

With Heyhoe-Flint as co-author, Rheinberg wrote a history of the women's game.

In 1999 she was one of the first ten women to be awarded honorary membership of MCC.

References

External links
 
 

England women Test cricketers
Cricket historians and writers
English cricket administrators
English cricket umpires
Members of the Order of the British Empire
1911 births
2006 deaths
People educated at South Hampstead High School
English Jews
Jewish cricketers
Middlesex women cricketers